On May 15, 2006, the United States Department of Defense acknowledged that there have been 7 Uzbek detainees held in Guantanamo.
The Guantanamo Bay detainment camps were opened on January 11, 2002, at the Guantanamo Bay Naval Base, in Cuba.
The Bush administration asserted that all detainees taken in the "global war on terror" could be held there, in extrajudicial detention, without revealing their names.  So far as the detainee's families and friends would know, they would just disappear.

However, the Associated Press had filed a Freedom of Information Act request for the names of all the detainee.
The Department of Defense filed justifications for why they should not be obliged to release the information the Associated Press requested.  They justified keeping the information secret not to protect the United States "national security", but merely because they were concerned to protect the detainee's privacy.

The Department of Defense exhausted their legal appeals and were forced, by a court order, to release the identities of all the Guantanamo detainees.

List of Uzbeks whom the DoD has acknowledged they have held in Guantanamo

On September 26, 2009, the Department of Justice announced that three men were transferred from Guantanamo.
One of the men was Yemeni detainee Alla Ali Bin Ali Ahmed, who was repatriated to Yemen.
The two other men were transferred to Ireland.  Their names were withheld.
Reuters reported that Ireland had previously inquired into taking two Uzbek detainees.

On September 27, 2009, the Associated Press reported that one of the two men was "31-year-old Oybek Jabbarov".
Dermot Ahern, the Minister of Justice, asked reporters to respect the men's privacy.

Switzerland accepted one former Uzbekistani detainee on January 26, 2010. 
His name was withheld.

See also
Furkat Kasimovich Yusupov

References

Lists of Guantanamo Bay detainees by nationality

United States–Uzbekistan relations